Stanley is an American children's animated television series that aired on Playhouse Disney based on the series of children's books written by "Griff" (as indicated on the cover of the original book), also known as Andrew Griffin. It was produced by Cartoon Pizza and was developed for television by Jim Jinkins (the creator of Doug, PB&J Otter, Allegra's Window, JoJo's Circus, and Pinky Dinky Doo) and David Campbell. The show features Charles Shaughnessy as the voice of Dennis the Goldfish.

The series follows Stanley, voiced by Jessica D. Stone, and teaches a wide variety of issues preschool children face, including change, growth, rules, and dealing with others. Each episode centers on an animal that deals with or helps explain the issue Stanley is grappling with.

Bahamian Junkanoo and reggae fusion group Baha Men, who are known for their hit song "Who Let the Dogs Out", sang the series' main theme song, "My Man Stanley".

Synopsis
Each episode shows Stanley (voiced by Jessica D. Stone) in a situation he does not fully understand. He discusses it with his pet goldfish Dennis (Charles Shaughnessy) before consulting either his computer or the Great Big Book of Everything, a remarkably complete zoology book aimed at young children. By observing how an animal copes with the same situation Stanley faces, or how it can overcome a similar difficulty, Stanley learns to deal with the situation himself.

Throughout the show Stanley and all his preschool aged friends are able to talk to his pet cat, Elsie (Hynden Walch) and dog Harry (Rene Mujica) as well as Dennis. Other animals also seem to occasionally respond, but never talk or give a definite indication they truly understood what was said. Stanley and his friends actively try to keep the adults (that is, except Stanley's grandmother), and by extension Stanley's older brother Lionel, from realizing this.

The Great Big Book of Everything is magical in nature, able to either let the animals out of the pages or allow the children to enter, sometimes changing them into animals in the process. This does not appear to be imaginary since occasionally adults do notice the noise, and Stanley works hard to hide the animals. There is also an episode where Stanley's brother sees a whale on the roof but dismisses the memory when it disappears back into the book.

The Halloween special features Stanley's grandmother who, it is implied, is a witch. She reveals that she too can work the book, and in fact was the one who gave it to Stanley for a fourth birthday present. She was also the one who taught its theme song to Harry and Elsie.

When someone says the "Great Big Book of Everything", hints it out, or even has the book, Elsie and Harry will wake up or find their way into the scene and start singing. This usually annoys Dennis, who after the introductory verse, says something like "Oh, not again!"

Characters
 Stanley Griff (voiced by Jessica D. Stone) is an imaginative 6-year-old boy. Stanley has three pets: a goldfish named Dennis, a dog named Harry, and a cat named Elsie. Stanley has an older brother named Lionel, who enjoys playing his electric guitar, a father who stays at home and draws cartoons, and a mother who is a dentist (the latter two were revealed in the episode "Double-Duty Dad"). 
 Dennis (voiced by Charles Shaughnessy) is a male goldfish and one of Stanley’s pets. In fact, Dennis is Stanley's best friend who gives him education about animals to help him with his everyday problems, which interest him. Dennis also has to point out the flaws in Stanley's ridiculous solutions. Dennis even breaks the fourth wall by either encouraging the audience to do something fun or by asking them questions at the end of almost every episode.
 Lionel Griff (voiced by Shawn Pyfrom) is the older brother of Stanley. Lionel likes rock and roll music a lot and always wears headphones on his ears, but still loves his younger brother very much by giving him advice, helping out with his homework, and looking out for him. Lionel is 11.5 years old.
 Mark Griff (voiced by David Landsberg) is the father of Stanley and Lionel. Mark is a stay-at-home father but works anyway as a cartoonist. Mark wears glasses, a dark purple short-sleeved shirt, dark pants, has short dark strands of hair and has a beard. 
 Dr. Joyce Griff (voiced by Ari Meyers) is the sweet and caring mother of Stanley and Lionel. Joyce works as a dentist and loves her family very much. However, Joyce does have ophidiophobia, which is the fear of snakes. Joyce has red hair, wears jeans, a green collared short-sleeved shirt, red lipstick and white shoes. Whether at the pool or the beach, her bathing suit is mostly a two piece bikini style.
 Harry (voiced by Rene Mujica) and Elsie (voiced by Hynden Walch respectively) are two more of Stanley’s pets. Harry is a male brown dog who loves eating and napping and Elsie is a female yellow cat who also loves napping and often purrs before she says something. They both sing a song about the Great Big Book of Everything, which greatly annoys Dennis. No matter how far away they are, they always manage to sing the song when the time comes. In “Dolphin Talk”, it is Harry’s birthday and Elsie, Stanley, Dennis, Marci, and Mimi help plan a surprise party for him.
 Lester Goldberg (voiced by Philece Sampler) is one of Stanley's friends. Lester has a father who is referred to as Mr. Goldberg (voiced by Wallace Shawn) and a mother who is referred to as Mrs. Goldberg (Didi Conn). In "Little Dog Lost", it is revealed that he is Jewish because not only is his last name Goldberg, Lester does not celebrate Christmas and Lester celebrates Hanukkah. But Lester gets a present for every one of the 8 nights of the holiday. In the episode Gorilla Sleepover it is revealed that his mom's first name is Nancy. Lester also has a little sister named Samantha who went to Mrs. Griff for a dental checkup and in the episode "Tasmanian Tantrum" Samantha throws tantrums when Samantha wants something.
 Marci & Mimi (both voiced by Khylan Jones) are African-American identical twin sisters who are very good friends with Stanley. They both have black hair, but Mimi's hair is long with a purple hairbow on the top of her head and Marcie's hair is tied in a ponytail. In "Little Dog Lost", it's revealed that they celebrate Kwanzaa.
 Jane (voiced by Macy H. Morikawa) is a Chinese-American girl that is in Stanley's class. Jane has pigtails and appears in several episodes. Jane invites Stanley to her house in "Guess Who's Coming to Dinner".
 Ben (voiced by Aria Noelle Curzon) is a boy that wears a hat. Ben appears in "Me and My Pal Fish!" where Ben takes Stanley's ball. Stanley stands up to him saying that he and Lester make a great team. Ben makes cameos in other episodes.
 Teresa Kirby (voiced by Kelsy Kemper) is a girl that appears in the episode "Shell Game". Teresa is the same age as Stanley. Teresa gets shy and Stanley doesn't know why Teresa's shy. Later on, Stanley apologizes and him and Teresa were great friends. Teresa has a pet turtle (because Stanley and Dennis learned about turtles in this episode).

Voice cast
 Jessica D. Stone as Stanley Griff
 Charles Shaughnessy as Dennis
 Rene Mujica as Harry
 Hynden Walch as Elsie
 David Landsberg as Mark Griff
 Ari Meyers as Joyce Griff
 Shawn Pyfrom as Lionel Griff
 Philece Sampler as Lester Goldberg
 Khylan Jones as Mimi & Marci
 Candi Milo as Ms. Diaz
 Wallace Shawn as Mr. Goldberg
 Didi Conn as Mrs. Goldberg
 Megan Taylor Harvey as Samantha
 Lucy Hagan as Max

Episodes

Season 1 (2001)

Season 2 (2002–03)

Season 3 (2004)

TV specials
 "Little Dog Lost" (Christmas)
 "Grandma Griff's Mystery Guest" (Halloween)
 "Stanley's Dinosaur Roundup"
 "A Turkey of a Thanksgiving" (Thanksgiving)
 "Stanley's Great Big Book of Adventure"

Broadcast history
In the U.S., the series debuted on Disney Channel's daytime preschool block Playhouse Disney on September 15, 2001. When Playhouse Disney rebranded its on-air presentation in 2007, Stanley was put on a new time slot at 6:00 AM ET on weekends. Stanley stopped airing in May 2008, but the show was still available on PlayhouseDisney.com. In February 2011, the show was completely removed when Playhouse Disney rebranded as Disney Junior. The show was briefly seen online on DisneyJunior.com as part of "fan favorites" week on the week of June 20, 2011. From March 23, 2012, to September 2, 2013, the series returned on the U.S. airwaves on Disney Junior. And Stanley was kept on demand from that point until 2019, when it was removed. The show has yet to be added to Disney+; although, reruns are currently airing on the weekends on Disney Junior in Japan.

In Canada, it ran on The Family Channel from 2002 to 2007 and then was moved to Disney Junior, which ran from November 30, 2007, until September 29, 2013, when it was removed from the schedule. It also aired on the Canadian-French version of Disney Junior since 2010.

Canada
Family (Canada) (2001 - November 29, 2007)
Disney Junior (English Canada) (November 30, 2007 – September 27, 2013)
Disney Junior (French Canada) (May 6, 2011 - 2013)
Playhouse Disney (English Canada) (November 30, 2007 - September 27, 2013)
Playhouse Disney (French Canada) (July 5, 2010 - May 5, 2011)

United States
Disney Channel (Playhouse Disney) (September 15, 2001 - 2008)
Disney Junior (March 23, 2012 - 2013)

Japan
Disney Channel (Disney Junior) (2012–Present)

Stanley's Great Big Book of Adventure
Stanley wanted to help Lionel finish his new song, so he gets help from a Kokako bird from the Great Big Book of Everything to do so, but the bird takes the finished song back into the book, prompting Stanley and Dennis to get it back. They were only able to retrieve half of the song, prompting Lionel to take the book.
While looking at the Great Big Book of Everything, Lionel sees a page about the arctic and (seeing the place as the perfect place to write a song without noise, bothers, and brothers) wished he could live there, which caused the book to suck him there.
Stanley and Dennis tries to find Lionel in many habitats in the book, using the adaptations of the native animals to aid them. but several incidents with Harry and Elsie cause the trio to switch from habitat to habitat,
When Mrs. Griff came to Stanley's room to check on him, Harry and Elsie try to hide the book, but caused all the pages to fall out, not only resulting in Lionel and Stanley with Dennis swapping habitats again. Stanley convinced his mom that he's working things out with Lionel, and after she was glad to hear this she tells him dinner starts in half an hour, causing the others to speed up their search. Stanley, who is now on a farm, suddenly sees an elephant, a camel, and a penguin in the exact same area. After learning this was because the pages fell out, Stanley and Dennis tried to come out of the book to fix this, only to find that they're stuck due to the same condition.
So, Stanley's friends are called to come over and race to put the Great Big Book of Everything back together, hoping to free Stanley, Dennis and Lionel, and saving all the animals, while Stanley and Dennis continue to look for Lionel.

Awards and nominations
Emmy Award
2002 – Outstanding Performer in an Animated Program – Charles Shaughnessy for playing "Dennis" (won)

Film
On January 3, 2006, Walt Disney Home Entertainment and Cartoon Pizza released a full-length direct-to-video movie based on Stanley. Entitled Stanley's Dinosaur Round-Up, the film centers on the titular character as he, along with Elsie, Dennis, Harry, Marci, Mimi and Lester team up to save his Great Uncle Stew (John Ritter, who completed his work for the film before he died)'s dude ranch from the greedy Rockin' Rory (Randy Quaid) who intends to buy the ranch and turn it into an amusement park.

References

External links
Channels
 Stanley on Disney Junior Canada
 Stanley on Disney Junior Quebec
 Stanley DVDs Disney US site
Playhouse Disney Official Site

Others
 
 

2000s American animated television series
2001 American television series debuts
2004 American television series endings
American children's animated comedy television series
American children's animated fantasy television series
American preschool education television series
Animated preschool education television series
2000s preschool education television series
American television series with live action and animation
Animated television series about children
Disney animated television series
Disney Channel original programming
Disney Junior original programming
English-language television shows
Peabody Award-winning television programs
Television series created by Jim Jinkins
Television series by Disney